Łukasz Woszczyński (born February 13, 1983) is a Polish sprint canoer who competed in the mid-2000s. He won two silver medals in the C-4 500 m at the ICF Canoe Sprint World Championships, earning them in 2003 and 2006.

Woszczyński also finished fifth in the C-2 1000 m event at the 2004 Summer Olympics in Athens.

References

External links 
 
 
 
 

1983 births
Canoeists at the 2004 Summer Olympics
Living people
Olympic canoeists of Poland
Polish male canoeists
People from Wałcz
ICF Canoe Sprint World Championships medalists in Canadian
Sportspeople from West Pomeranian Voivodeship
World Rowing Championships medalists for Poland